Straight Up Steve Austin is an American reality television series that airs on USA Network hosted by Stone Cold Steve Austin. The series premiered on August 12, 2019 after Monday Night Raw. This series focuses on Austin and a celebrity guest swap stories about their lives and careers as they travel across the country.

On January 10, 2020, the series was renewed for a second season, which premiered on January 11, 2021.

Episodes

Season 1 (2019)

Season 2 (2021)

References

External links

2019 American television series debuts
English-language television shows
USA Network original programming